Smirnov Peak is a sharp peak, 2,105 m, standing 2.5 nautical miles (4.6 km) south of Ristkalvane Nunataks in Shcherbakov Range, Orvin Mountains, in Queen Maud Land. Mapped from air photos and surveys by Norwegian Antarctic Expedition, 1956–60; remapped by Soviet Antarctic Expedition, 1960–61, and named after Aleksandr A. Smirnov, a member of the expedition.

Mountains of Queen Maud Land
Princess Astrid Coast